The 2015 ISAF Sailing World Cup was a series of sailing regattas staged during 2014–15 season. The series featured boats which feature at the Olympics and Paralympics.

Regattas

Results

2.4 Metre

Men's 470

Women's 470

Men's 49er

Women's 49er FX

Men's Finn

Open Formula Kite

Men's Laser

Women's Laser Radial

Mixed Nacra 17

Men's RS:X

Women's RS:X

Mixed SKUD 18

Para Sonar

References

External links
 Official website
 AllSportDB.com Competition page

2014-15
2014 in sailing
2015 in sailing